Mr. Pennsylvania Football also referred to as Mr. PA Football is an American athletic award given to the most skilled high school football players in Pennsylvania. The award has been given out since 2010 with a two tier format, two players are awarded the award from schools competing in 1A to 3A and another from 4A to 6A.

Voting Process 
All current high school football players in Pennsylvania are eligible. Nominations are made by the general public, with Nominees progressing through four rounds of online voting.  At each stage, fans, the media, and the coaches each represent 1/3 of the vote.

Mr. PA Football Annual Awards Banquet 
Held in February or March, the five finalists from each category are invited to attend the annual Awards Banquet in Harrisburg, PA, where the winner is announced for the Mr. PA Football Award, the Lineman's Award, The Michael Payton Quarterback Award, and the Mickey Minnich Legendary Coach Award.

A Division 1 Football Head Coach typically serves as the Keynote Speaker.

2020 and 2021 Awards Program
Because of the ongoing Covid-19 restrictions in Pennsylvania, the 2020 and 2021 Awards Programs were held online.  With segments recorded over several days, the winners were announced in a Live broadcast, and the entire program was posted online.  It was also shown several times on Pennsylvania Cable Network.

Mr. PA Football Award Winners

Mr. PA Football Lineman Award Winners

Michael Payton Memorial Quarterback Award Winners 
This award, given to a Quarterback, is named in honor of College Football Hall of Fame member Michael Payton, a member of the Board of Advisors, who passed away in 2018.

Mickey Minnich Legendary Coach award winners 
This award recognizes PA high school football head coaches that have outstanding records and achievements on and off the field.  It is named in honor of Coach Mickey Minnich, a long time coach, executive director of the Big 33 Football Game, and founder of Vickie's Angels Foundation.

*Coach Chaump had an additional collegiate coaching record of 71–73–2

Keynote Speakers and Master of Ceremonies for the Awards Banquet

Reference

Notes

Mr. Football awards